David James Karpa (born May 7, 1971) is a Canadian former professional ice hockey player who played in the National Hockey League for the Quebec Nordiques, Mighty Ducks of Anaheim, Carolina Hurricanes and New York Rangers between 1993 and 2003. He was selected 68th overall by the Nordiques in the 1991 NHL Entry Draft from Ferris State University.

Coaching career
On May 19, 2015, Karpa was named the assistant head coach for the Flint Firebirds of the Ontario Hockey League (OHL). In a highly publicized incident, he was fired a month into the season, along with head coach John Gruden. Following a successful player walkout, Karpa was reinstated as the Firebirds assistant head coach. On February 17, 2016, Karpa was again fired by the Firebirds.

On August 8, 2016, Karpa was named the head coach and general manager of the Peoria Mustangs in the Tier III junior level North American 3 Hockey League. His tenure in Peoria ended after just one season.

Personal life
Karpa's son Zakary Karpa is a ice hockey center for the Hartford Crimson.  He was drafted by the Rangers in the 6th round of the 2022 NHL Entry Draft with the 191st overall pick in the draft.

Career statistics

Regular season and playoffs

References

External links 
 

1971 births
Living people
Amur Khabarovsk players
Bridgeport Sound Tigers players
Canadian ice hockey defencemen
Carolina Hurricanes players
Cincinnati Cyclones (IHL) players
Cornwall Aces players
Ferris State Bulldogs men's ice hockey players
Flint Firebirds coaches
Halifax Citadels players
Hartford Wolf Pack players
Sportspeople from Regina, Saskatchewan
Mighty Ducks of Anaheim players
New York Rangers players
Quebec Nordiques draft picks
Quebec Nordiques players
San Diego Gulls (ECHL) players
Syracuse Crunch players
Wilkes-Barre/Scranton Penguins players
Ice hockey people from Saskatchewan
Canadian ice hockey coaches